The Pester Women's Charitable Society (Pesti Jótékony Nőegylet), founded in 1817 in Pest, was the first women's organization to form in Hungary. It was a Christian organization. In this organization middle and upper-class women worked together. The organization provided welfare services. It ended in 1892.

References

Organizations established in 1817
Christianity in Hungary
Christian organizations based in Europe
Religious organisations based in Hungary